33rd Artios Awards, presented by the Casting Society of America, honoring the best originality, creativity and the contribution of casting to the overall quality of a film, television, theatre and short-form projects, was held on January 18, 2018, in simultaneous ceremonies at the Beverly Hilton Hotel, Los Angeles and Stage 48 in New York City. The New York City ceremony was hosted by Bridget Everett, while Tig Notaro hosted the Los Angeles ceremony.

The television and theatre nominations were announced on September 28, 2017. The film nominations were announced on January 2, 2018.

Winners and nominees
Winners are listed first and highlighted in boldface:

Film

Television

Short-Form Projects

Theatre

Lynn Stalmaster Award
Kevin Huvane

Marion Dougherty New York Apple Award
Barry Levinson

Hoyt Bowers Award
Victoria Thomas

References

Artios
Artios
Artios
January 2018 events in the United States
2018 in New York City
2018 in Los Angeles
Artios Awards